The North Korea women's national volleyball team and Amega represents North Korea in international volleyball competitions and friendly matches. They won bronze medal in the 1970 Women's World Championship and at the 1972 Summer Olympics.

Results
The following are the rank of the North Korea women's volleyball team on their past tournaments.

 Champions   Runners-up   Third place   Fourth place

Summer Olympics

World Championship

Asian Games

Squads
 1972 Summer Olympics - 3rd place
Ri Chun-Ok, Kim Myong-Suk, Kim Zung-Bok, Kang Ok-Sun, Kim Yeun-Ja, Hwang He-Suk, Jang Ok-Rim, Paek Myong-Suk, Ryom Chun-Ja, Kim Su-Dae, and Jong Ok-Jin. Head coach:.
 2010 Asian Games - 4th place
Kim Un-jong, Kim Yong-mi, Jong Jin-sim, Han Ok-sim, Min Ok-ju, Choe Ryon, Kim Kyong-suk, Ri Hyon-suk, Nam Mi-hyang, Kim Hye-ok, Kim Ok-hui, Ri Sun-jong. Head coach: Kang Ok-sun.

Head coaches
 Moro Branislav (2015-2016)

References

Volleyball
Korea, North
Volleyball in North Korea